The 2 '''arrondissements of the Haute-Saône department are:
 Arrondissement of Lure, (subprefecture: Lure) with 193 communes. The population of the arrondissement was 109,260 in 2016.  
 Arrondissement of Vesoul, (prefecture of the Haute-Saône department: Vesoul) with 346 communes. The population of the arrondissement was 127,982 in 2016.

History

In 1800 the arrondissements of Vesoul, Gray and Lure were established. The arrondissement of Gray was disbanded in 1926. 

The borders of the arrondissements of Haute-Saône were modified in January 2017:
 three communes from the arrondissement of Lure to the arrondissement of Vesoul
 five commune from the arrondissement of Vesoul to the arrondissement of Lure

References

Haute-Saone